Edwin Forbes Glenn (January 10, 1857 – August 5, 1926) was a United States Army officer in the late 19th and early 20th centuries. He served in World War I among other capacities.

Biography
Glenn was born near Greensboro, North Carolina, on January 10, 1857. After attending a private boys school in North Carolina and a preparatory school in New York, he entered the United States Military Academy, graduating in 1877.

Glenn was commissioned into the 25th Infantry Regiment, and he did frontier duty from 1877 to 1888. In 1888, he joined the University of Minnesota, working as its first professor of Military Science and Tactics in addition to teaching mathematics. During this time, Glenn studied law and received a degree, joining the Minnesota Bar. He served as the judge advocate of the Department of the Dakota and later of the Department of the Columbia. After commanding rescue and exploration missions in the District of Alaska, he became a judge advocate in the Philippines in 1900. While in the Philippines, he and the soldiers under his command, which included Arthur L. Conger, subjected Filipinos to torture by water cure, for which he was court-martialed, convicted, and sentenced to suspension from command for a month and a fine of fifty dollars. Glenn commanded the Columbus Barracks from 1905 to 1907, and he subsequently returned to the Philippines with the 32nd Infantry Regiment, remaining there until 1913. Glenn entered the United States Army War College in 1913, and after he graduated, he became the Chief of Staff of the Department of the East. From 1916 to 1917, he commanded the 18th Infantry Regiment and the First Separate Brigade at Camp Cody.

Glenn was promoted to the rank of brigadier general on May 15, 1917, and subsequently to major general on August 5, 1917, and he subsequently organized and commanded the 83rd Infantry Division, commanding it from August 25, 1917, to January 13, 1918. He received the Legion of Honour. During demobilization in 1919, Glenn commanded Camp Sherman in Ohio. He retired as a brigadier general in December 1919.

In addition to his military service, Glenn served as "one of the earlier presidents" of the predecessor of the Association of the United States Army, serving from 1913 to 1920. He also wrote two books, the first being Glenn's International Law in 1895 and the second being Rules of Land Warfare in 1914.

In retirement, Glenn lived in Glendon, in Moore County, North Carolina. He died on August 5, 1926. Congress restored his rank of major general in June 1930.

Personal life
Glenn married Louise Smythe while doing frontier duty early in his military career.

References

Bibliography

1857 births
1926 deaths
Military personnel from North Carolina
United States Army Infantry Branch personnel
People from Greensboro, North Carolina
People from Moore County, North Carolina
Commandeurs of the Légion d'honneur
United States Army generals of World War I
19th-century American writers
20th-century American male writers
United States Military Academy alumni
United States Army War College alumni
20th-century American writers
United States Army generals
University of Minnesota faculty
United States Army personnel who were court-martialed
American people convicted of war crimes